Georgina Roty (born 31 May 1908, date of death unknown) was a French swimmer. She competed in two events at the 1928 Summer Olympics.

References

External links
 

1908 births
Year of death missing
French female freestyle swimmers
Olympic swimmers of France
Swimmers at the 1928 Summer Olympics
Place of birth missing